Cobram Anglican Grammar School (CAGS) is a small co-educational school in Cobram, Victoria founded in 2000 as Christ the King Anglican College, before changing its name in 2015 when the school was acquired by the Anglican Schools Commission (Inc.).
The motto of the school is "Integrity, Endeavour, Community".
The current principal is Mr Keith Willett.

Overview 
The school campus is located on Campbell Road Cobram, opposite the Cobram Sports Stadium and just a short walk from the Murry River. The school as of 2021 offers classes for students from Foundation through to Year 12. And although small in size compared to other independent/private schools in the region, CAGS offers curriculum closely aligned with current the Victorian and Australian Curriculum as well as a wide range of extra subjects for the senior students such as Woodwork, Food Technology, Art, Language (Chinese), Biology, Legal Studies, Agriculture and many more.

As of the first half of 2021 the school's campus includes many special purpose facilities, these include a library, an Art/Textiles/Woodwork/automotive wing, a Performing Arts Center (PAC), Science Laboratory, Computer and STEM Lab and a large Agriculture Center.

References

Secondary schools in Victoria (Australia)
Educational institutions established in 2000
2000 establishments in Australia
Anglican schools in Australia